Anejaculation is the pathological inability to ejaculate despite an erection in males, with (orgasmic) or without (anorgasmic) orgasm.

Causes

It can depend on one or more of several causes, including:
 Sexual inhibition
 Pharmacological inhibition. They include mostly antidepressant and antipsychotic medication, and the patients experiencing that tend to quit them
 Autonomic nervous system malfunction
 Prostatectomy - surgical removal of the prostate.
 Ejaculatory duct obstruction
 Spinal cord injury causes sexual dysfunction including anejaculation. The rate of being able to ejaculate varies with the type of lesion, as detailed in the table at right.
 Old age
 Diabetes mellitus

Anejaculation, especially the orgasmic variant, is usually indistinguishable from retrograde ejaculation. However, a negative urinalysis measuring no abnormal presence of spermatozoa in the urine will eliminate a retrograde ejaculation diagnosis.
Thus, if the affected person has the sensations and involuntary muscle-contractions of an orgasm but no or very low-volume semen, ejaculatory duct obstruction is another possible underlying pathology of anejaculation.

Management

Anejaculation in spinal cord injury

The first-line method for sperm retrieval in men with spinal cord injury is penile vibratory stimulation (PVS). The penile vibratory stimulator is a plier-like device that is placed around the glans penis to stimulate it by vibration. In case of failure with PVS, spermatozoa are sometimes collected by electroejaculation, or surgically by per cutaneous epididymal sperm aspiration (PESA) or testicular sperm extraction (TESE).

Notes

Male genital disorders
Ejaculation